Thomas Cordes (5 May 1826 – 16 Aug 1901) was a British Conservative Party politician.

He was the Member of Parliament for Monmouth Boroughs from 1874 to 1880,

References

External links 
 

1826 births
1901 deaths
Conservative Party (UK) MPs for Welsh constituencies
UK MPs 1874–1880